Naxos is a Greek island and the largest of the Cyclades. It was the centre of archaic Cycladic culture. The island is famous as a source of emery, a rock rich in corundum, which until modern times was one of the best abrasives available.

The largest town and capital of the island is Chora or Naxos City, with 7,374 inhabitants (2011 census). The main villages are Filoti, Apiranthos, Vivlos, Agios Arsenios, Koronos and Glynado.

History

Mythic Naxos 

According to Greek mythology, the young Zeus was raised in a cave on Mt. Zas ("Zas" meaning "Zeus"). Homer mentions "Dia"; literally the sacred island "of the Goddess". Károly Kerényi explains:

One legend has it that in the Heroic Age before the Trojan War, Theseus abandoned Ariadne on this island after she helped him kill the Minotaur and escape from the Labyrinth. Dionysus (god of wine, festivities, and the primal energy of life) who was the protector of the island, met Ariadne and fell in love with her. But eventually Ariadne, unable to bear her separation from Theseus, either killed herself (according to the Athenians), or ascended to heaven (as the older versions had it). The Naxos portion of the Ariadne myth is also told in the Richard Strauss opera Ariadne auf Naxos.

The giant brothers Otus and Ephialtes figure in at least two Naxos myths: in one, Artemis bought the abandonment of a siege they laid against the gods, by offering to live on Naxos as Otus's lover; in another, the brothers had actually settled Naxos.

It is also said that the sea god Poseidon was passing by Naxos whilst driving his chariot on the sea surface and is where he first laid eyes on his future wife, the nereid Amphitrite as she was dancing there.

Middle Paleolithic era 
Stelida quarry, south-west of Chora, contains Mousterian tools dating back to the Middle Paleolithic era, which indicates that Neanderthal activity on the island spanned almost 200,000 years ago. The extinct dwarf elephant Palaeoloxodon lomolinoi lived on Naxos until hominids arrived on the island.

Cycladic civilisation 
Zas Cave, inhabited during the Neolithic era, contained objects of stone from Melos and copper objects including a dagger and gold sheet. The presence of gold and other objects within the cave indicated to researchers the status of the inhabitant.

Emery was exported during that time, to other islands.

Classical era and Greco-Persian Wars 

During the 8th and 7th centuries BC, Naxos dominated commerce in the Cyclades. 

Herodotus describes Naxos circa 500 BC as the most prosperous Greek island.

In 499 BC, an unsuccessful attack on Naxos by Persian forces led several prominent men in the Greek cities of Ionia to rebel against the Persian Empire in the Ionian Revolt, and then to the Persian War between Greece and Persia.

Naxos was the first Greek city-state to attempt to leave the Delian League circa 469 BC; Athens quickly quashed the notion and forcibly removed all military naval vessels from the island's control. Athens then demanded all future payments from Naxos in the form of gold rather than military aid.

Byzantine era 

In Late Antiquity, the island was part of the province of the Islands.

Pope Martin I was detained on the island of Naxos for almost a year after he was arrested by Byzantine authorities in Rome due to his holding of a synod that condemned monotheletism. He was held on the island prior to being taken to Constantinople for trial. While detained on the island, he wrote to a certain Theodore living in Constantinople. 

Under the Byzantine Empire, Naxos was part of the thema of the Aegean Sea, which was established in the mid-9th century.

In Byzantine times, the island's capital was on the southern fortress of Apalyres. During this time, it suffered from Saracen raids, particular during the existence of the Emirate of Crete (824–961), to which the island occasionally paid tribute. Traces of Muslim artistic influence are visible in frescoes from the 10th century. Nevertheless, as in Antiquity, Naxos was celebrated for its agriculture and animal husbandry; the 12th-century geographer al-Idrisi records extensive cattle raising on the island.

In the late 12th century, it may have been the capital of a short-lived thema of the "Dodekanesos".

Duchy of Naxos 

In the aftermath of the Fourth Crusade, with a Latin Empire under the influence of the Venetians established at Constantinople, the Venetian Marco Sanudo conquered Naxos and most of the other Cyclades in 1205–1207. Of all the islands, only on Naxos was there any opposition to Sanudo: a group of Genoese pirates had occupied the castle between the end of Byzantine rule and Sanudo's arrival. To steel his band's resolve, Sanudo burnt his galleys "and bade his companions to conquer or die". The pirates surrendered the castle after a five weeks' siege.

Naxos became the seat of Sanudo's realm, known as the "Duchy of Naxos" or "Duchy of the Archipelago". Twenty-one dukes in two dynasties ruled the Archipelago, until 1566; Venetian rule continued in scattered islands of the Aegean until 1714. Under Venetian rule, the island was called by its Italian name, Nasso.

The Sanudi introduced Western feudal law to the island, based on the Assizes of Romania. However, the native Greek population continued to use Byzantine law for civil matters at least until the late 16th century.

In the 13th century, following the capture of Antalya and Alanya on the southern Anatolian coast by the Seljuk Turks, refugees from these areas settled in Naxos. In the 14th century, the island was once more exposed to raids, this time from the Anatolian Turkish beyliks, chiefly the Aydınids. In turn, the Sanudi assisted the Genoese in capturing Chios in 1304 and the Knights Hospitaller in their conquest of Rhodes in 1309, in order to stop these islands being used as Turkish pirate base. Nevertheless, raids against Naxos are recorded in 1324 and 1326, and in 1341, Umur of Aydın carried off 6,000 people from the island and imposed a payment of tribute. Two years later, however, the Smyrniote crusade captured his main port, Smyrna. 

The relief was temporary, however, as Turkish raids recommenced later in the century. The island was so depopulated that Cristoforo Buondelmonti in  claimed that there were not enough men to wed the Naxiot women. The rising Ottoman Empire first attacked the island in 1416, but the Sultans recognized Venetian overlordship over the Duchy in successive treaties, in exchange for an annual tribute.

Ottoman control (1566–1821) 
The Ottoman administration remained essentially in the hands of the Venetians; the Porte's concern was satisfied by the returns of taxes. Very few Turks ever settled on Naxos, and Turkish influence on the island is slight. Under Ottoman rule the island was known as Turkish: Nakşa. Ottoman sovereignty lasted until 1821, when the islands revolted; Naxos finally became a member of the Greek state in 1832.

Geography

Climate 
Naxos experiences a Mediterranean climate, with relatively mild winters and warm summers.  The Köppen Climate Classification subtype for this climate is "Csa". (Mediterranean Climate).
 Inland areas of the island are much wetter and cooler in winter.

Economy

Historical population

Tourism 
Naxos is a popular tourist destination, with several ruins. It has a number of beaches, such as those at Agia Anna, Agios Prokopios, Alikos, Kastraki, Mikri Vigla, Plaka, and Agios Georgios, most of them near Chora.
As other cycladic islands, Naxos is considered a windy place perfect for windsurfing, as well as kitesurfing. There are seven sports clubs in the island that offer both of these sports and other water activities.

Agriculture 
Naxos is the most fertile island of the Cyclades. It has a good supply of water in a region where water is usually inadequate. Mount Zeus is the highest peak in the Cyclades, and tends to trap the clouds, permitting greater rainfall. This has made agriculture an important economic sector with various vegetable and fruit crops as well as cattle breeding, making Naxos the most self-sufficient island in the Cyclades. Naxos is well known within Greece for its "Arseniko Naxou" cheese, potatoes and Kitron, a local lemon-citrus spirit.

Marble
The quarrying of marble on Naxos began before 550 BCE. Naxian marble was used for the creation of the roof tiles at ancient Olympia and on the Athenian Acropolis, As of 2016, about 5,000 m³ of high value Naxian marble was being exported annually.

Sports 
 Pannaxiakos A.O. (sports club)

Notable people 
 Ecumenical Patriarch Anthimus III of Constantinople (1762-1842)
 Ecumenical Patriarch Callinicus III of Constantinople (died 1726) 
 Keti Chomata (1946–2010), singer
 Manolis Glezos (1922–2020), rebel, politician, writer
 Giannoulis Fakinos (born 1989), soccer player 
 Iakovos Kambanelis (1922–2011), poet, playwright, lyricist and novelist
 Kostas Manolas (born 1991), soccer player
 Stelios Manolas (born 1961), soccer player
 Nikolaos Mykonios, fighter of the Greek War of Independence and officer of the Greek Army
 Iakovos Nafpliotis (1864–1942), cantor
 Nicodemus the Hagiorite (1749–1809), saint
 Giorgos Ninios (born 1959), actor 
 Michalis Polytarchou, basketball player, Former Captain of AEK Athens BC
 Petros Protopapadakis (1854–1922), Prime Minister of Greece

Gallery

See also 
 Communities of the Cyclades
 Emery (rock), mined on Naxos
 Kitron
 Moutsouna

Citations

General references 

 Agelarakis, A., "The Naxos Island Archaic Period Necropolis: Archaeological-Anthropology Research Report", Hellenic Antiquities Authority, Archival Report, 2005, Naxos.
 Ernst Curtius, Naxos. Ein Vortrag im wissenschaftlichen Verein zu Berlin 1846 gehalten, neu herausgegeben von Martin Biastoch, Göttingen, 2012.

External links 

  
 Moving Postcards Naxos
 Municipality of Naxos and Small Cyclades 
 Photos from Naxos inclusive Tourist-Infos

 
Euboean colonies
Greek city-states
Islands of Greece
Islands of the South Aegean
Landforms of Naxos (regional unit)
Members of the Delian League